Port of Hell is a 1954 American drama film directed by Harold D. Schuster and written by Tom Hubbard, Fred Eggers and Gil Doud. The film stars Dane Clark, Carole Mathews, Wayne Morris, Marshall Thompson, Marjorie Lord and Harold Peary. The film was released on December 5, 1954, by Allied Artists Pictures.

Plot

Cast          
Dane Clark as Gibson Pardee
Carole Mathews as Julie Povich
Wayne Morris as Stanley Povich
Marshall Thompson as Marsh Walker
Marjorie Lord as Kay Walker
Harold Peary as Leo
Otto Waldis as Snyder
Tom Hubbard as Nick
Charles Fredericks as 'Sparks' Reynolds
James Alexander as Parker 
Victor Sen Yung as Detonation Ship Radioman

References

External links
 

1954 films
1950s English-language films
American drama films
1954 drama films
Allied Artists films
Films directed by Harold D. Schuster
American black-and-white films
1950s American films